Slobodan Jakovljević (born 26 May 1989) is a Serbian professional footballer who plays as a centre-back for Bosnian Premier League club Zrinjski Mostar.

Career
Jakovljević was born in Pristina, and in his early career played for the youth teams of Sloga Temerin, Crvena Zvezda Novi Sad and Cement Beočin, before joining the first team of Mladost Apatin. In the 2010–11 season, he moved to Novi Sad for two seasons.

In the season 2012–13, he signed with Novi Pazar and played in the Serbian SuperLiga. On 11 August 2012, Jakovljević made his debut in the SuperLiga playing against Radnički Niš in a 3–0 home win.

After Novi Pazar, he also played for Inđija, Szigetszentmiklósi, Radnik Surdulica, Spartak Subotica and Radnik Bijeljina. With Radnik he won the 2015–16 Bosnian Cup.

In June 2016, Jakovljević signed with Zrinjski Mostar. So far with Zrinjski, he has won two Bosnian Premier League titles, in the seasons 2016–17 and 2017–18. On 22 June 2019, Jakovljević extended his contract with Zrinjski until June 2022.

Honours
Radnik Bijeljina
Bosnian Cup: 2015–16

Zrinjski Mostar
Bosnian Premier League: 2016–17, 2017–18, 2021–22

References

External links
Slobodan Jakovljević at Sofascore

1989 births
Living people
Footballers from Novi Sad
Serbian footballers
Serbian expatriate footballers
Expatriate footballers in Hungary
Expatriate footballers in Bosnia and Herzegovina
Serbian expatriate sportspeople in Hungary
Serbian expatriate sportspeople in Bosnia and Herzegovina
Serbian SuperLiga players
Nemzeti Bajnokság I players
Premier League of Bosnia and Herzegovina players
FK Mladost Apatin players
RFK Novi Sad 1921 players
FK Novi Pazar players
FK Inđija players
Szigetszentmiklósi TK footballers
FK Radnik Surdulica players
FK Spartak Subotica players
FK Radnik Bijeljina players
HŠK Zrinjski Mostar players
Association football defenders